The Lucas Oil World Series of Off-Road Racing (WSORR) was an American off-road racing series. The series began in 2007 and it ended after the 2008 season.

Classes
WSORR sanctioned classes from Trophy Trucks down to grassroots racers.  Feature classes included high performance, high power Trophy race trucks in 4x4, 2WD and compact pickup truck configurations.

Tracks
Bark River International Raceway (2007, 2008)
Crandon International Off-Road Raceway (2007, 2008)
Lucas Oil Speedway (2007, 2008)
Sunnyview Expo Center (2008)
Steele County Fairgrounds (2007)

Champions

PRO 4x4
2008 Kent Brascho 
2007 Johnny Greaves

PRO 2WD

2008 Dan Vanden Heuvel, Sr. 
2007 Scott Taylor

PRO Light
2008 Jeff Kincaid 
2007 Chad Hord

SRT Super Truck
2008 Keith Steele 
2007 Ben Wandahsega

PRO Super Buggy
2008 John Mason 
2007 Gary Nierop

SRT Stock Truck
2008 Eric Ruppel 
2007 Scott Beauchamp

SRT 1600 Buggy
2008 Mark Steinhardt 
2007 John Fitzgerald

SRT 1600 Light
2008 Mike Vanden Heuvel 
2007 Jamie Kleikamp

SRT Formula 4x4
2008 Dave DeMaegd 
2007 Dave DeMaegd

Grassroots Classix
2008 Rob Weiland

Grassroots Enduro
2008 Jim Van Rixel

Television
WSORR events were shown tape delayed on American television on Speed Channel and on Motors TV in Europe. VERSUS broadcast some of the events.

References

External links

Official website

Auto racing organizations in the United States
Off-road racing series
Sports in the Midwestern United States